Wootton Broadmead Halt was a railway station on the Varsity Line which served the settlement of Wootton Broadmead near Stewartby in Bedfordshire, England. Opened in 1905, it was closed temporarily during both world wars and did not reopen after 1941, officially closing in 1952.

History 

Wootton Broadmead was one of three halts opened by the London and North Western Railway in 1905 between Stewartby and Bedford. Their opening coincided with the introduction of a steam railmotor on the Varsity Line, and each was sited alongside a level crossing. All three halts were opened at the same time and were all closed during the First World War as an economy measure. Wootton Broadmead and Kempston & Elstow Halt were also suspended from service during the Second World War for the same reason, never to reopen. Wootton Broadmead lingered without use until it was officially closed in 1952.

Unlike other halts to the south and north, Wootton Broadmead was not conveniently situated near any local community, although there was a brickworks in the vicinity. It was located at the north end of Forder's Sidings on the line's 12 milepost.

Present day 
Nothing remains of the halt.

References 

Disused railway stations in Bedfordshire
Former London and North Western Railway stations
Railway stations in Great Britain opened in 1905
Railway stations in Great Britain closed in 1917
Railway stations in Great Britain opened in 1919
Railway stations in Great Britain closed in 1952